West Reading is a borough in Berks County, Pennsylvania, United States. The population was 4,212 at the 2010 census. It contains a vibrant main street (Penn Avenue) and the large Reading Hospital and Medical Center. It was also the site of the VF Outlet Village, one of the largest outlet malls in the United States. The VF Outlet Village was located in the buildings of the former Berkshire Knitting Mills, which was in operation from 1908 to 1975. The VF Outlet closed in 2020.

Geography

Demographics

As of the census of 2000, there were 4,049 people, 1,666 households, and 862 families residing in the borough. The population density was 7,079.6 people per square mile (2,742.7/km2). There were 1,783 housing units at an average density of 3,117.5 per square mile (1,207.8/km2). The racial makeup of the borough was 89.33% White, 4.03% African American, 0.22% Native American, 1.53% Asian, 0.02% Pacific Islander, 3.41% from other races, and 1.46% from two or more races. Hispanic or Latino of any race were 7.78% of the population.

There were 1,666 households, out of which 23.6% had children under the age of 18 living with them, 36.0% were married couples living together, 11.9% had a female householder with no husband present, and 48.2% were non-families. 39.4% of all households were made up of individuals, and 14.3% had someone living alone who was 65 years of age or older. The average household size was 2.11 and the average family size was 2.84.

In the borough, the population was spread out, with 18.7% under the age of 18, 8.2% from 18 to 24, 28.8% from 25 to 44, 18.0% from 45 to 64, and 26.3% who were 65 years of age or older. The median age was 40 years. For every 100 females, there were 82.6 males. For every 100 females aged 18 and over, there were 78.8 males.

The median income for a household in the borough was $38,340, and the median income for a family was $43,472. Males had a median income of $31,592 versus $25,411 for females. The per capita income for the borough was $21,414. About 5.8% of families and 9.5% of the population were below the poverty line, including 16.0% of those under age 18 and 3.6% of those aged 65 or over.

Economy

The Reading Hospital and Medical Center is the largest employer in the borough and one of the top five employers in Berks County. The parent company, Tower Health, has its headquarters in the borough.

West Reading also has a bustling business district with bars, restaurants, shops, and salons.

Government
TA council-manager form of government governs the Borough of West Reading. The council's president is Ryan Lineaweaver, and the Vice President is Phillip Wert. The five other members are as follows: Christopher Lincoln, Patrick Kaag, Jennifer Bressler, Denise Drobnick, and Zachary Shaver. Each council member is elected to four and two-year terms, which are on a rotating cycle. The Mayor of the Borough is Samantha Kaag. Her primary role is public safety, oversight of the Police Department, community involvement, and working hand-in-hand with the Borough Council. The Magisterial District Judge of West Reading (and Wyomissing) is Eric J. Taylor.

Notable people
 John Fetterman (b. 1969), politician 
 Al Gursky (b. 1940), former professional football player, New York Giants
 Michael W. Kirst (b. 1939), former president, California State Board of Education
 Andrew H. Knoll, (b. 1951), natural history professor, Harvard University
 Austin Swift (b. 1992), actor
 Taylor Swift (b. 1989), singer-songwriter

Transportation

U.S. Route 422 is the main highway serving West Reading. It follows the West Shore Bypass along a northwest-to-southeast alignment across the northeastern portion of the borough. U.S. Route 422 Business follows the old alignment of US 422 along Penn Avenue through the center of the borough.

References

External links

 Love West Reading
 Borough of West Reading

Populated places established in 1873
Boroughs in Berks County, Pennsylvania